José Enrique Rondón Díaz (born 2 November 1999) is a Venezuelan professional footballer who plays as a forward.

Career

Club career
Rondón is a product of Mineros de Guayana. He got his professional debut for the club on 18 May 2018 against Deportivo Táchira in the Venezuelan Primera División. He made a total of eight appearances in his first season as a professional. In the 2019 season, he played 20 league games for Mineros.

In the 2020 season, Rondón played on loan for fellow league club LALA FC.

References

External links
 

Living people
1999 births
Association football forwards
Venezuelan footballers
Venezuelan Primera División players
A.C.C.D. Mineros de Guayana players
People from Ciudad Guayana